The arrondissement of Angoulême is an arrondissement of France in the Charente department in the Nouvelle-Aquitaine region. It has 115 communes.

Composition

The communes of the arrondissement of Angoulême, and their INSEE codes, are:
 
 Agris (16003)
 Angoulême (16015)
 Asnières-sur-Nouère (16019)
 Aubeterre-sur-Dronne (16020)
 Balzac (16026)
 Bardenac (16029)
 Bazac (16034)
 Bellon (16037)
 Bessac (16041)
 Blanzaguet-Saint-Cybard (16047)
 Boisné-la-Tude (16082)
 Bonnes (16049)
 Bors-de-Montmoreau (16052)
 Bouëx (16055)
 Brie (16061)
 Brie-sous-Chalais (16063)
 Bunzac (16067)
 Chadurie (16072)
 Chalais (16073)
 Champniers (16078)
 Charras (16084)
 Châtignac (16091)
 Chazelles (16093)
 Claix (16101)
 Combiers (16103)
 Coulgens (16107)
 Courgeac (16111)
 Courlac (16112)
 La Couronne (16113)
 Curac (16117)
 Deviat (16118)
 Dignac (16119)
 Dirac (16120)
 Écuras (16124)
 Édon (16125)
 Les Essards (16130)
 Eymouthiers (16135)
 Feuillade (16137)
 Fléac (16138)
 Fouquebrune (16143)
 Garat (16146)
 Gardes-le-Pontaroux (16147)
 Gond-Pontouvre (16154)
 Grassac (16158)
 Gurat (16162)
 L'Isle-d'Espagnac (16166)
 Jauldes (16168)
 Juignac (16170)
 Laprade (16180)
 Linars (16187)
 Magnac-Lavalette-Villars (16198)
 Magnac-sur-Touvre (16199)
 Mainzac (16203)
 Marillac-le-Franc (16209)
 Marsac (16210)
 Marthon (16211)
 Médillac (16215)
 Montboyer (16222)
 Montbron (16223)
 Montignac-le-Coq (16227)
 Montmoreau (16230)
 Mornac (16232)
 Moulins-sur-Tardoire (16406)
 Mouthiers-sur-Boëme (16236)
 Nabinaud (16240)
 Nersac (16244)
 Nonac (16246)
 Orgedeuil (16250)
 Orival (16252)
 Palluaud (16254)
 Pillac (16260)
 Plassac-Rouffiac (16263)
 Poullignac (16267)
 Pranzac (16269)
 Puymoyen (16271)
 Rioux-Martin (16279)
 Rivières (16280)
 La Rochefoucauld-en-Angoumois (16281)
 La Rochette (16282)
 Ronsenac (16283)
 Rouffiac (16284)
 Rougnac (16285)
 Roullet-Saint-Estèphe (16287)
 Rouzède (16290)
 Ruelle-sur-Touvre (16291)
 Saint-Adjutory (16293)
 Saint-Avit (16302)
 Saint-Germain-de-Montbron (16323)
 Saint-Laurent-des-Combes (16331)
 Saint-Martial (16334)
 Saint-Michel (16341)
 Saint-Quentin-de-Chalais (16346)
 Saint-Romain (16347)
 Saint-Saturnin (16348)
 Saint-Séverin (16350)
 Saint-Sornin (16353)
 Saint-Yrieix-sur-Charente (16358)
 Salles-Lavalette (16362)
 Sers (16368)
 Sireuil (16370)
 Souffrignac (16372)
 Soyaux (16374)
 Taponnat-Fleurignac (16379)
 Torsac (16382)
 Touvre (16385)
 Trois-Palis (16388)
 Vaux-Lavalette (16394)
 Villebois-Lavalette (16408)
 Vindelle (16415)
 Vœuil-et-Giget (16418)
 Voulgézac (16420)
 Vouthon (16421)
 Vouzan (16422)
 Yviers (16424)
 Yvrac-et-Malleyrand (16425)

History

The arrondissement of Angoulême was created in 1800. On 1 January 2008 the four cantons of Aigre, Mansle, Ruffec and Villefagnan that previously belonged to the arrondissement of Angoulême were added to the arrondissement of Confolens, and the canton of Rouillac to the arrondissement of Cognac. At the January 2017 reorganisation of the arrondissements of Charente, it lost 14 communes to the arrondissement of Cognac and 15 communes to the arrondissement of Confolens, and it gained two communes from the arrondissement of Cognac.

As a result of the reorganisation of the cantons of France which came into effect in 2015, the borders of the cantons are no longer related to the borders of the arrondissements. The cantons of the arrondissement of Angoulême were, as of January 2015:

 Angoulême-Est
 Angoulême-Nord
 Angoulême-Ouest
 Aubeterre-sur-Dronne
 Blanzac-Porcheresse
 Chalais
 La Couronne
 Gond-Pontouvre
 Hiersac
 Montbron
 Montmoreau-Saint-Cybard
 La Rochefoucauld
 Ruelle-sur-Touvre
 Saint-Amant-de-Boixe
 Soyaux
 Villebois-Lavalette

References

Angouleme